Treccia d’oro is a  typical cake of Crema. It’s a  baked cake made of yeast dough and candied fruit.

Origin
The "Treccia d’oro" ( the Golden plait ) was invented in the years 1937-1938 and exhibited at the "Fiera di Padova"  by the pastry chef Zironda, who later patented it and opened independently the shop “Pasticceria Zironda”. 
Vittorio Maccalli started to work there as an apprentice and when the owner decided to retire, Maccalli replaced him. Later he opened a shop in Piazza Garibaldi in Crema, named “Treccia d’oro”. Lombardy has recognised this "Treccia d’oro" as an  handmade product of Crema and its surrounding area, the "Cremasco".

Ingredients
The cake is twist-shaped and the mixture contains:
flour;
butter;
sugar;
brewer’s yeast;
candied fruit (orange and citron);
raisins;
water;
confectioners sugar (on the top);
salt.

The cake can be conserved for up to two weeks.

Bibliography
Daniela Bianchessi e Roberta Schira, Terra piatti & piatti, Crema, Gianni Iuculano Editore, 2003.

Cakes